The 1922 North Texas State Normal Eagles football team was an American football team that represented the North Texas State Normal College (now known as the University of North Texas) during the 1923 college football season as a member of the Texas Intercollegiate Athletic Association (TIAA). In their third year under head coach Theron J. Fouts, the team compiled an overall record of 5–2–1 with a mark of 3–0 in conference play.

Schedule

References

North Texas State Teachers
North Texas Mean Green football seasons
North Texas State Teachers Eagles football